Prince Dance Group, a dance troupe based in Berhampur, (Contact Details : +91 9861180053)  Odisha, India led by T. Krishna Mohan Reddy. It has won a reality show India's Got Talent on an Indian TV channel "Colors". The group is unique that the members are from a remote part of India and most of them are from disadvantaged sections of different parts of Ganjam district. Two of them, Padmanabha Sahu (24) and Telu Tarini (13) are physically disabled. They have won the hearts of all Odias, including chief minister Naveen Patnaik, and even outsiders with their performance in the programme "India's Got Talent". Prince Group also performed in Sardotsav- annual winter festival in Pithoragarh (Uttarakhand) on 6 November 2014.

The group
After winning Rs 50 lakh (Rs five million) prize money and a Ritz car from the Colors channel, a pleasant surprise lay in store for them. The Odisha government announced a cash prize of Rs two crore (Rs twenty million) and four acres of land for the group to build a dance academy.

Confirming the news, Krishna Mohan Reddy, the choreographer of Prince Dance Group said, "We have heard that our government has announced a prize for us. We feel honoured. I am very happy that our efforts have paid off."

The group, which is from Berhampur, Odisha, consists of 20 members. Krishna leads the team and the rest are labourers from a construction site. It was their Krishna act which earned the group accolades from the viewers nationwide and they also became a favourite with the judges.

Commenting on their future plans, Krishna added, "I am a choreographer and want to grow in this profession. With the land provided to us by the government I want to build a dance academy and take this art forward. I would also want to perform on an international platform."

India's Got Talent
The group did an astonishing performance depicting Lord Krishna and his avatars that got good comments from all the three judges. Shekhar Kapoor was mesmerised by their performance. In their semi-final act on 15 August, they depicted the Indian Flag. The special act in which two of the group's  challenged students also performed moved the judges to tears. The audience became so involved in the act that they started chanting "Bharat mata ki jay", after the performance was over.

Prince Group performed in Sardotsav- annual winter festival in Pithoragarh (Uttarakhand) on 6 November 2014.

References

External links
 
 *Krishna-Story of a Dancer(Odia Film)

Arts organisations based in India
Ganjam district
Physically integrated dance
Indian dance groups
Participants in Indian reality television series
Got Talent winners
Disability in India
Dance companies